Karjat Khalapur Assembly constituency is one of the 288 Vidhan Sabha (legislative assembly) constituencies in Maharashtra state in western India. This constituency is located in the Raigad district.

Members of Legislative Assembly

See also
 Karjat
 List of constituencies of Maharashtra Vidhan Sabha

References

Politics of Raigad district
Assembly constituencies of Maharashtra